Jürgen Dittrich is an East German sprint canoer who competed in the late 1970s. He won a gold medal in the K-4 500 m event at the 1979 ICF Canoe Sprint World Championships in Duisburg.

References

German male canoeists
Living people
Year of birth missing (living people)
ICF Canoe Sprint World Championships medalists in kayak